Hot Streak is the second album by the American hard rock supergroup The Winery Dogs. It was released on October 2, 2015, but was premiered on September 29 on AllMusic.

Commenting on the record, guitarist and vocalist Richie Kotzen said:

The opening song "Oblivion", released as the album's first single, was composed during the band's debut album's sessions, and performed live in its subsequent tour. Because Kotzen had the lyrics for the chorus but not for the verses, every time the song was performed, the lyrics would be different.

"Empire" was almost left out of the album, but drummer Mike Portnoy "begged" Kotzen not to discard it since he appreciated the song and wanted to finish it.

The album debuted at No. 6 on Billboard's Top Rock Albums chart, selling 13,000 copies in its first week.

Track listing
All tracks written by The Winery Dogs.

Charts

Personnel
Richie Kotzen – lead vocals, guitars, keyboards
Billy Sheehan – bass, vocals
Mike Portnoy – drums, percussion, vocals

References

2015 albums
The Winery Dogs albums